Spring Day is a holiday, celebrated in several countries, marking the coming of the spring season.

Spring Day may also refer to:

 Spring Day (comedian), American comedian, writer, and actor
 Spring Day (Pozdneev), a 1959 painting by Nikolai Pozdneev
 "Spring Day" (song), a 2017 song by BTS
 Spring Day (TV series), a 2005 South Korean television drama
 Spring Day (film), a 2022 South Korean film

See also
 Spring Festival (disambiguation)